The Crystal Ball is a 1943 film directed by Elliott Nugent and starring Ray Milland and Paulette Goddard.

Plot
A maid, in cahoots with Madame Zenobia (Gladys George), a fake psychic, fools Jo Ainsly (Virginia Field) into believing Zenobia to be a gifted fortune teller.

Madame Zenobia helps a young beauty queen, Toni Gerard (Paulette Goddard), find a job with Pop Tibbots (Cecil Kellaway) in an arcade. Toni ends up conspiring with Madame Zenobia to fool Jo's handsome attorney, Brad Cavanaugh (Ray Milland), into buying a piece of land.

The plan backfires when the land purchase gets Brad in trouble with the government. Toni, who has fallen for Brad, tries to persuade Zenobia to reveal her deceit, but Zenobia locks her in a closet and flees. Toni has to convince Brad that her love for him is real.

Cast
 Ray Milland as Brad Cavanaugh
 Paulette Goddard as Toni Gerard
 Gladys George as Madame Zenobia
 Virginia Field as Jo Ainsly
 Cecil Kellaway as Pop Tibbots
 William Bendix as Biff Carter

References

External links
 
 
 
 
 

1943 films
1943 romantic comedy films
American romantic comedy films
American black-and-white films
1940s English-language films
Films directed by Elliott Nugent
Paramount Pictures films
Films scored by Victor Young
United Artists films
1940s American films